Tyrone Donnive Young (April 29, 1960 – October 15, 2015) was an American college and professional football player who was a wide receiver in the National Football League (NFL) for two seasons during the 1980s.  Young played college football for the University of Florida, and thereafter, he played professionally for the NFL's New Orleans Saints.

Early life 

Young was born in Ocala, Florida in 1960.  He attended Forest High School in Ocala, and he was the quarterback for the Forest Wildcats high school football team.  Young led the Wildcats to back-to-back Florida state football championships in 1975 and 1976.

College career 

Young accepted an athletic scholarship to attend the University of Florida in Gainesville, Florida, where he played for coach Doug Dickey and coach Charley Pell's Florida Gators football teams from 1978 to 1982.  The Gators coaching staff decided to red-shirt him as a true freshman in 1978, but he subsequently worked his way up the depth chart to briefly become the Gators' starting quarterback.  He subsequently changed positions to wide receiver and was paired with another converted quarterback, Cris Collinsworth, as the Gators' star flankers.  During Young's sophomore season in 1980, he was a member of the Gators team that posted the biggest one-year turnaround in the history of NCAA Division I football—from 0–10–1 in 1979 to an 8–4 bowl team in 1980.  Memorably, Young caught ten passes for 183 yards against the Georgia Bulldogs in 1980, which remains the eighth best single-game performance by a Gators wide receiver  He also caught a fifty-one-yard touchdown reception against the Florida State Seminoles in 1981.

Young graduated from the University of Florida with a bachelor's degree in 1988.

Professional career 

He saw limited action in his rookie season, but had almost 600 yards receiving as a second-year pro. In his two NFL seasons, Young played in thirty-two games and had thirty-six receptions for 682 yards and six touchdowns.

Death 

Young died on October 15, 2015, in San Diego, California from multiple myeloma, which was first diagnosed in 2004.  He was 55 years old.

See also
 List of New Orleans Saints players
 List of University of Florida alumni

References

Bibliography 

 Carlson, Norm, University of Florida Football Vault: The History of the Florida Gators, Whitman Publishing, LLC, Atlanta, Georgia (2007).  .
 Golenbock, Peter, Go Gators!  An Oral History of Florida's Pursuit of Gridiron Glory, Legends Publishing, LLC, St. Petersburg, Florida (2002).  .
 Hairston, Jack, Tales from the Gator Swamp: A Collection of the Greatest Gator Stories Ever Told, Sports Publishing, LLC, Champaign, Illinois (2002).  .
 McCarthy, Kevin M.,  Fightin' Gators: A History of University of Florida Football, Arcadia Publishing, Mount Pleasant, South Carolina (2000).  .
 Nash, Noel, ed., The Gainesville Sun Presents The Greatest Moments in Florida Gators Football, Sports Publishing, Inc., Champaign, Illinois (1998).  .

1960 births
2015 deaths
Deaths from multiple myeloma
American football quarterbacks
American football wide receivers
Florida Gators football players
Florida Gators men's basketball players
New Orleans Saints players
Ocala High School alumni
Sportspeople from Ocala, Florida
American men's basketball players